Times Two was an American male duo composed of vocalists/keyboardists Shanti Jones and Johnny Dollar, both from Point Reyes, California.  They wrote most of their own material, and either produced or co-produced it, as well.

History
They debuted in 1988 with their Warner Bros./Reprise album X2, which reached No. 137 on the Billboard 200. In the US their biggest hit was "Strange But True," which peaked at No. 21 on the Billboard Hot 100.

That year, Debbie Gibson's manager Douglas Breitbart signed Times Two as the opening act for her Out of the Blue Tour.

Their second U.S. single "Cecilia" (a cover of Simon & Garfunkel's hit, featuring work by Paul Simon himself, and produced by Club Nouveau's Jay King) was far less successful, only reaching No. 79 on the Billboard Hot 100. The song went to No. 1 in New Zealand for three weeks in 1988, however, spending 14 weeks on the chart altogether. The album X2 made No. 13 in New Zealand on the strength of their No. 1, spending 11 weeks on the chart.

Poor sales figures (for whatever reason) eventually led to the duo being dropped from Warner/Reprise, but they soon resurfaced in 1990 on EMI Records with the EP "Danger Is My Business." The track "Jack the Jill" prominently featured samples from Blue Swede's 1974 cover of B. J. Thomas' 1969 hit song "Hooked on a Feeling."

The EP was initially meant to serve as a teaser for their next full-length album Hi-Fi & Mighty. A small number of promotional copies of this full-length album were distributed, which included the tracks from the previous EP, some other all-new songs, and also a couple of remixes. However, problems with management led to the cancellation of its commercial release, and the album was shelved. Soon afterward, Times Two disbanded.

Post-breakup
Shanti Jones fronted a band called Sex & Reverb; they have produced several CDs.

Johnny Dollar subsequently performed under the name Giovanni Di Morente, and performed with El Radio Fantastique in San Francisco's Bay Area.

Discography

Studio albums
 X2 (1988)
 Hi-Fi & Mighty (1990) (only released in certain countries)

Extended plays
 Danger Is My Business (1990)

Singles
 "Strange but True" (1988) peaked #21 on U.S. Billboard Hot 100, and #12 on the US Dance chart.
 "Cecilia" (1989) peaked at #79 on U.S. Billboard Hot 100
 "Set Me Free" (1990)

References

External links
[ Times Two] on Allmusic.com
Times Two – Strange But True – release listing on Discogs.com

American pop music groups
American musical duos